Stupeflip is a French hip hop band formed in 2000, composed of Julien Barthélémy, Stéphane Bellenger and Jean-Paul Michel. Their style can be described as a mix of hip hop, punk rock and synthpop.

Stupeflip members are known by their stage personas: Julien Barthélémy as King Ju and Pop Hip, Stéphane Bellenger as Cadillac and Jean-Paul Michel as MC Saló. These characters and the band itself are part of an elaborate fictional universe featuring mysterious concepts such as "L'Ère du Stup" ("The Stup Era"), "La Menuiserie" ("The Carpentry"), "Le Mystère au chocolat" ("The Chocolate Mystery"), etc.

The band rose to fame with its single "Je Fume Pu D'Shit" in 2003. After having released their two first albums on BMG, the label decided to stop their contract in 2006 after the poor sales of Stup Religion. After a hiatus, the band then began auto-producing themselves, releasing The Hypnoflip Invasion in 2011. For their fourth album, Stup Virus, Stupeflip began soliciting financial support on the crowdfunding platform Ulule. The crowdfunding campaign was a huge success, with the original stretch goal of 40 000€ being raised in just two hours. The campaign ended with a total of 427 972€, making it the biggest crowdfunding effort for a band in Europe. Stup Virus was released on March 3 2017.

Discography
 2003 : Stupeflip
 2005 : Stup Religion
 2011 : The Hypnoflip Invasion
 2012 : Terrora!! (EP)
 2017 : Stup Virus
 2022 :  Stup Forever

References

French hip hop groups
French punk rock groups
Musical groups established in 2000
Masked musicians
Bands with fictional stage personas
Musical groups from Paris